The Vantia are a Rajput clan found in the state of Gujarat in India.

Origin
Vantia were originally  Rajput. They surrendered their lands to Sultans of Ahmedabad keeping only strips (Vanti) of land.

See also
 Rajputs of Gujarat
 Jinkara

References

Rajput clans of Gujarat